Argentina competed at the 2018 Summer Youth Olympics in Buenos Aires, Argentina from 6 October to 18 October 2018, as host nation.

Medalists
Medals awarded to participants of mixed-NOC teams are represented in italics. These medals are not counted towards the individual NOC medal tally.

|width="30%" align=left valign=top|

Competitors

Archery 

Argentina qualified two athletes based on host nation.

 Boys' Individual - 1 quota
 Girls' Individual - 1 quota

Athletics

As hosts, Argentina was given four athlete quotas (2 boys and 2 girls) to compete in athletics.

 Boys' events - 2 athletes
 Girls' events - 2 athletes

But finally these 7 athletes, based on Panamerican rankings, are selected: Nazareno Sassia (SP), Pablo Zaffaroni (PV), Gustavo Agustín Osorio (JT), Pedro Garrido (400 m hs), Julio Nobile (HT), Luciano Méndez (TJ) and Lázaro Bonora (DT), only boys.

Boys
Track and road events

Field events

Badminton

As hosts, Argentina was given a spot to compete in the boys' and girls' singles events. Argentina only sent 1 boy.

Singles

Team

Basketball

As hosts, Argentina is given a spot to compete in both the boys' and girls' tournaments.

 Boys' Tournament - 1 team of 4 athletes
 Girls' Tournament - 1 team of 4 athletes

Shoot-out contest

Dunk contest

Beach handball 

As hosts, Argentina were given a spot to compete in the boys' and girls' tournament.

Beach volleyball

As hosts, Argentina was given a spot to compete in the boys' and girls' tournaments.

 Boys' Tournament - 1 team of 2 athletes
 Girls' Tournament - 1 team of 2 athletes

Boxing

As hosts, Argentina was given quotas to compete in two boys' and one girls' events.

Boys

Girls

Canoeing

Argentina entered three boats based on its performance at the 2018 World Qualification Event.

 Boys' C1 - 1 boat
 Boys' K1 - 1 boat
 Girls' K1 - 1 boat

Boys

Girls

Cycling

As hosts, Argentina was given spots to compete in the boys' and girls' combined team events and in the mixed BMX racing team event. However they declined to compete in BMX racing. They later qualified two athletes in BMX freestyle based on its performance at the 2018 Urban Cycling World Championship.

 Boys' combined team - 1 team of 2 athletes
 Girls' combined team - 1 team of 2 athletes
 Mixed BMX freestyle - 1 boy and 1 girl

Mixed BMX freestyle park

Combined team

Dancesport

As hosts, Argentina was given two quotas to compete in dancesport.

 B-Boys - Broly
 B-Girls - Vale

Equestrian

As hosts, Argentina was given a quota to compete.

 Individual Jumping - 1 athlete

Fencing

As hosts, Argentina was given quotas to compete in all weapons.

 Boys' Épée - 1 quota
 Boys' Foil - 1 quota (not used)
 Boys' Sabre - 1 quota
 Girls' Épée - 1 quota (not used)
 Girls' Foil - 1 quota (not used)
 Girls' Sabre - 1 quota (not used)

Boys

Field hockey

As hosts, Argentina was given a spot to compete in both tournaments.

 Boys' tournament - 1 team of 9 athletes
 Girls' tournament - 1 team of 9 athletes

Boys' Tournament 

Roster

 Agustín Cabaña
 Gaspár Garrone
 Nehuén Hernando
 Ignacio Ibarra
 Tadeo Marcucci
 Santiago Micaz
 Facundo Sarto
 Lisandro Zago
 Facundo Zárate

 Preliminary round

 Quarterfinals

 Semifinals

 Bronze medal game 

Girls' Tournament 

Roster

 Brisa Bruggesser
 María Cerundolo
 Celina di Santo
 Azul Iritxity
 Victoria Miranda
 Gianella Palet
 Lourdes Pérez
 Sofía Ramallo
 Josefina Rubenacker

 Preliminary round

Quarterfinals

Semifinals

Gold medal game

Futsal

As hosts, Argentina can compete in either the boys' or girls' tournament.

1 team of 10 athletes

Boys' tournament

Roster

 Matías Coronel
 Alan de Candia
 Facundo Gassmann
 Joaquín Hernández
 Franco Pezzenati
 Agustín Raggiati
 Ezequiel Ramírez
 Santiago Rufino
 Nahuel Urriza
 Christian Vargas

Group stage

Semifinals

Bronze medal match

Golf

As hosts, Argentina was given a quota to compete in the men's and women's events.

 Men's individual - 1 quota
 Women's individual - 1 quota

Individuals

Mixed team

Gymnastics

Artistic
As hosts, Argentina was given a quota to compete in the boys' and girls' events.

 Boys' artistic individual all-around - 1 quota
 Girls' artistic individual all-around - 1 quota

Rhythmic
As hosts, Argentina was given a quota to compete in the girls' event.

 Girls' rhythmic individual all-around - 1 quota

Trampoline
As hosts, Argentina was given a quota to compete in either the boys' or girls' event.

 Boys' trampoline - 1 quota

Judo

As hosts, Argentina was given a quota to compete in two events.

 Boys' events - 1 quota
 Girls' events - 1 quota

Individual

Team

Karate

As hosts, Argentina was given a quota to compete in four events.

 Boys' events - 2 quotas
 Girls' events - 2 quotas (declined)

Modern pentathlon

As hosts, Argentina has been given a spot to compete in the boys' and girls' events. Based on their performance at the 2018 Youth A World Championship Argentina can choose to send Martina Armanazqui or use its host quota.

Roller speed skating

As hosts, Argentina was given a quota to compete in all events.

 Boys' combined speed event - Nahuel Schelling Quevedo
 Girls' combined speed event - Fernanda Illanes Cabrera

Rowing

Argentina qualified a boat based on its performance at the 2017 World Junior Rowing Championships. They also qualified one boat in girls' single sculls based on their performance at the American Qualification Regatta.

 Boys' pair – 2 athletes
 Girls' single sculls - 1 athlete

Qualification Legend: FA=Final A (medal); FB=Final B (non-medal); FC=Final C (non-medal); SA/B=Semifinals A/B; SC/D=Semifinals C/D; QF=Quarterfinals;

Rugby sevens

As hosts, Argentina was given a quota to compete in the boys' tournament.

 Boys' tournament - 1 team of 12 athletes

Roster

 Lucio Cinti Luna
 Ramiro Costa
 Marcos Elicagaray
 Juan González
 Matteo Graziano
 Julián Hernández
 Ignacio Mendy
 Marcos Moneta
 Bautista Pedemonte
 Julián Quetglas
 Nicolás Roger
 Tomás Vanni

Group stage

Gold medal game

Sailing

As hosts, Argentina qualified in every event.

Shooting

As hosts, Argentina was given two quotas to compete in shooting, however they declined to compete in boys' 10m air pistol. Argentina later qualified one sport shooter in boys' 10m air rifle based on its performance at the American Qualification Tournament.

 Boys' 10m Air Rifle - 1 quota
 Girls' 10m Air Rifle - 1 quota

Individual

Team

Sport climbing

As hosts, Argentina was given a quota to compete in the boys' and girls' events. Argentina only sent 1 girl.

 Girls' combined - 1 quota

Swimming

As hosts, Argentina is allowed to send the maximum quota of four boys' and four girls.

Boys

Girls

Mixed

Table tennis

As hosts, Argentina was given two quotas to compete in table tennis. Argentina only sent 1 boy.

 Boys' singles - 1 quota
 Girls' singles - 1 quota

Taekwondo

As hosts, Argentina is allowed to send the maximum quota of three athletes.

Tennis

As hosts, Argentina is given a quota to compete in the boys' and girls' singles.

Singles

Doubles

Triathlon

As hosts, Argentina was given a quota to compete in the boys' and girls' races but only one female athlete competed.

Individual

Relay

Weightlifting

As hosts, Argentina is given two quotas to compete.

 Boys' events - 1 quota
 Girls' events - 1 quota

Wrestling

As hosts, Argentina is given three quotas to compete.

 Boys' freestyle events - 1 quota
 Boys' Greco-Roman events - 1 quota
 Girls' freestyle events - 1 quota

References

2018 in Argentine sport
Nations at the 2018 Summer Youth Olympics
Argentina at the Youth Olympics